Ludwig Prandtl (4 February 1875 – 15 August 1953) was a German fluid dynamicist, physicist and aerospace scientist. He was a pioneer in the development of rigorous systematic mathematical analyses which he used for underlying the science of aerodynamics, which have come to form the basis of the applied science of aeronautical engineering. In the 1920s he developed the mathematical basis for the fundamental principles of subsonic aerodynamics in particular; and in general up to and including transonic velocities. His studies identified the boundary layer, thin-airfoils, and lifting-line theories. The Prandtl number was named after him.

Early years
Prandtl was born in Freising, near Munich, on 4 February 1875. His mother suffered from a lengthy illness and, as a result, Ludwig spent more time with his father, a professor of engineering. His father also encouraged him to observe nature and think about his observations.

Prandtl entered the Technische Hochschule Munich in 1894 and graduated with a Ph.D. under guidance of Professor August Foeppl in six years.  His thesis was  "On Tilting Phenomena, an Example of Unstable Elastic Equilibrium" (1900), 

After university, Prandtl went to work in the Maschinenfabrick Augsburg-Nürnberg to improve a suction device for shaving removal in the manufacturing process. While working there, he discovered that the suction tube did not work because the lines of flow separated from the walls of the tube, so  the expected pressure rise in the sharply-divergent tube never occurred. This phenomenon had been previously noted by Daniel Bernoulli in a similar hydraulic case. Prandtl recalled that this discovery led to the reasoning behind his boundary-layer approach to resistance in slightly-viscous fluids.

Later years
In 1901 Prandtl became a professor of fluid mechanics at the technical school in Hannover, later the Technical University Hannover and then the University of Hannover. It was here that he developed many of his most important theories. On August 8, 1904, he delivered a groundbreaking paper, Über Flüssigkeitsbewegung bei sehr kleiner Reibung (On the Motion of Fluids in Very Little Friction), at the Third International Mathematics Congress in Heidelberg. In this paper, he described the boundary layer and its importance for drag and streamlining. The paper also described flow separation as a result of the boundary layer, clearly explaining the concept of stall for the first time. Several of his students made attempts at closed-form solutions, but failed, and in the end the approximation contained in his original paper remains in widespread use.

The effect of the paper was so great that Prandtl would succeed Hans Lorenz as director of the Institute for Technical Physics at the University of Göttingen later in the year. Over the next decades he developed it into a powerhouse of aerodynamics, leading the world until the end of World War II. In 1925 the university spun off his research arm to create the Kaiser Wilhelm Institute for Flow Research (now the Max Planck Institute for Dynamics and Self-Organization).

Following earlier leads by Frederick Lanchester from 1902–1907, Prandtl worked with Albert Betz and Max Munk on the problem of a useful mathematical tool for examining lift from "real world" wings. The results were published in 1918–1919, known as the Lanchester–Prandtl wing theory. He also made specific additions to study cambered airfoils, like those on World War I aircraft, and published a simplified thin-airfoil theory for these designs. This work led to the realization that on any wing of finite length,  wing-tip effects became very important to the overall performance and characterization of the wing Considerable work was included on the nature of induced drag and wingtip vortices,  which had previously been ignored. Prandtl showed that an elliptical spanwise lift distribution the most efficient, giving the minimum induced drag for the given span. These tools enabled aircraft designers to make meaningful theoretical studies of their aircraft before they were built.

Prandtl later extended his theory to describe a bell-like lift distribution, obtained by washing out the wing tips until negative lift was obtained, which gave the minimum induced drag for any given aircraft weight, also suggesting that adverse yaw forces could be countered solely by wing tip aerodynamics, but this new theory was largely ignored. In the 21st century the American engineer Al Bowers has confirmed the idea, calling his experimental wing the Prandtl-D.

Prandtl and his student Theodor Meyer developed the first theories of supersonic shock waves and flow in 1908. The Prandtl–Meyer expansion fans allowed for the construction of supersonic wind tunnels. He had little time to work on the problem further until the 1920s, when he worked with Adolf Busemann and created a method for designing a supersonic nozzle in 1929. Today, all supersonic wind tunnels and rocket nozzles are designed using the same method. A full development of supersonics would have to wait for the work of Theodore von Kármán, a student of Prandtl at Göttingen.

In 1922 Prandtl, together with Richard von Mises, founded the GAMM (the International Association of Applied Mathematics and Mechanics). and was its chairman from 1922 until 1933. Until 1945 he also worked closely with the RLM.

Other work examined the problem of compressibility at high subsonic speeds, known as the Prandtl–Glauert correction. This became very useful during World War II as aircraft began approaching supersonic speeds for the first time. He also worked on meteorology, plasticity and structural mechanics. He also made significant contributions to the field of tribology.

Prandtl and the Third Reich 
After Hitler's rise to power and the establishment of the Third Reich, Prandtl continued his role as director of the Kaiser Wilhelm Society. During this period the Nazi air ministry, led by Hermann Göring, often used Prandtl's international reputation as a scientist to promote Germany's scientific agenda. Prandtl appears to have happily served as an ambassador for the Nazi regime, writing in 1937 to a NACA representative "I believe that Fascism in Italy and National Socialism in Germany represent very good beginnings of new thinking and economics." Prandtl's support for the regime is apparent in his letters to G. I. Taylor and his wife in 1938 and 1939. Referring to Nazi Germany's treatment of Jews, Prandtl wrote "The struggle, which Germany unfortunately had to fight against the Jews, was necessary for its self-preservation." Prandtl also claimed that "If there will be war, the guilt to have caused it by political measures is this time unequivocally on the side of England."

As a member of the German Physical Society (DPG), Prandtl assisted Carl Ramsauer in drafting the DPG Petition in 1941. The DPG Petition would be published in 1942 and argued that physics in Germany was falling behind that of the United States due to rejection of "Jewish Physics" (relativity and quantum theory) from German physicists. After publication of the DPG Petition, the belief of "German Physics" superiority deteriorated to allow for German students to study these new fields in school.

Publications
Paul Peter Ewald, Theodor Pöschl, Ludwig Prandtl; authorized translation by J. Dougall and W.M. Deans The Physics of Solids and Fluids: With Recent Developments Blackie and Son (1930).

Death and afterwards

Prandtl worked at Göttingen until he died on 15 August 1953. His work in fluid dynamics is still used today in many areas of aerodynamics and chemical engineering. He is often referred to as the father of modern aerodynamics.

The crater Prandtl on the far side of the Moon is named in his honour.

The Ludwig-Prandtl-Ring is awarded by Deutsche Gesellschaft für Luft- und Raumfahrt in his honour for outstanding contribution in the field of aerospace engineering.

In 1992, Prandtl was inducted into the International Air & Space Hall of Fame at the San Diego Air & Space Museum.

Notable students

Jakob Ackeret
Albert Betz
Paul Richard Heinrich Blasius
Adolf Busemann
Kurt Hohenemser
Theodore von Kármán
Lu Shijia (Hsiu-Chen Chang-Lu)
Hubert Ludwieg
Hilda M. Lyon (1932–33)
Hans Multhopp
Max Munk
Johann Nikuradse
Reinhold Rudenberg
Hermann Schlichting
Walter Tollmien
Victor Vâlcovici
Vishnu Madav Ghatage
Karl Wieghardt
Theodor Meyer

See also
 Tesla turbine
 Particle image velocimetry
 Wind tunnel
 Subsonic and transonic wind tunnel
 Pitot tube
 Prandtl's one-seventh-power law
 Prandtl-M NASA research aircraft Preliminary Research Aerodynamic Design to Land on Mars, a backronym honoring Prandtl

References

External links

 Ludwig Prandtl's Biography in German, 258 pages
 Ludwig Prandtl's Biography in English, 265 pages
 Ludwig Prandtl's Boundary Layer
 Video recording of the E. Bodenschatz's lecture on life and work of Ludwig Prandtl

 

1875 births
1953 deaths
Aerodynamicists
Commanders Crosses of the Order of Merit of the Federal Republic of Germany
Fluid dynamicists
20th-century German physicists
People from Freising
Recipients of the Knights Cross of the War Merit Cross
Technical University of Munich alumni
Academic staff of the University of Göttingen
Foreign Members of the Royal Society
Tribologists
Max Planck Institute directors
RWTH Aachen University alumni